Maria Sharapova defeated Sara Errani in the final, 6–3, 6–2 to win the women's singles tennis title at the 2012 French Open. It was her first French Open title, and she completed the career Grand Slam with the win. It was Sharapova's first major title since the 2008 Australian Open, and her first since a shoulder surgery that threatened to end her career four years prior. She lost only one set during the tournament, to Klára Zakopalová in the fourth round. Sharapova regained the world No. 1 ranking with the win; Victoria Azarenka and Agnieszka Radwańska were also in contention for the top spot.

Li Na was the defending champion, but lost in the fourth round to qualifier Yaroslava Shvedova, the first time a defending champion was defeated by a qualifier in the tournament's history.

The tournament was notable for one of the biggest upsets in French Open history as world No. 111 Virginie Razzano defeated world No. 5 and 2002 champion Serena Williams in the first round, despite Williams being two points from victory at 5–1 in the second-set tiebreaker. Razzano became only the second player ranked outside the top 100 (after Sun Tiantian at the 2005 China Open) to defeat Williams in a WTA Tour-level main draw match. It was Williams' first loss in the first round of a major.

This tournament marked the major main-draw debut of future world No. 1 Karolína Plíšková.

Seeds

Qualifying

Draw

Finals

Top half

Section 1

Section 2

Section 3

Section 4

Bottom half

Section 5

Section 6

Section 7

Section 8

Championship match statistics

References

External links
 Main Draw
2012 French Open – Women's draws and results at the International Tennis Federation

Women's Singles
French Open by year – Women's singles
2012 in women's tennis
2012 in French women's sport